The glossy-backed becard (Pachyramphus surinamus) is a species of bird in the family Tityridae. It has traditionally been placed in Cotingidae or Tyrannidae, but evidence strongly suggests that it is better placed in Tityridae, where it is now placed by the South American Classification Committee. It is found in Brazil, French Guiana, and Suriname. Its natural habitat is subtropical or tropical moist lowland forests.

References

Pachyramphus
Birds described in 1766
Taxa named by Carl Linnaeus
Taxonomy articles created by Polbot